Pat Vamplew (born 24 November 1952) is a Canadian sports shooter. He competed at the 1984 Summer Olympics and the 1988 Summer Olympics.

References

External links
 

1952 births
Living people
Canadian male sport shooters
Olympic shooters of Canada
Shooters at the 1984 Summer Olympics
Shooters at the 1988 Summer Olympics
Sportspeople from Toronto
Commonwealth Games medallists in shooting
Commonwealth Games bronze medallists for Canada
Pan American Games medalists in shooting
Pan American Games gold medalists for Canada
Pan American Games silver medalists for Canada
Pan American Games bronze medalists for Canada
Shooters at the 1983 Pan American Games
Shooters at the 1987 Pan American Games
Shooters at the 1978 Commonwealth Games
Shooters at the 1982 Commonwealth Games
20th-century Canadian people
Medallists at the 1978 Commonwealth Games
Medallists at the 1982 Commonwealth Games